Newhaven Tunnel was a railway tunnel located on the Cromford and High Peak Railway near the village of Newhaven in Derbyshire. Mostly used for moving mineral and quarry traffic. It closed in 1967 along with the rest of the line. And today, the tunnel and trackbed form part of the High Peak Trail.

References 

Railway tunnels in England